Mitchell "Mitch" Potter (born September 16, 1980) is a male American track and field athlete, who competes in the sprints events, primarily the 400 metres. He is best known for winning the men's 400 metres event at the 2003 Pan American Games in Santo Domingo.

Early life
Potter was born in St. Michael, Minnesota and attended St. Michael-Albertville High School. While in high school, he won five state Track and Field titles, and in August 2012 still held two state records in the Class A 300-meter hurdles and 4 X 400 meter relay. He was a member of the 1999 STMA Track Team that won the MSHSL Track & Field Class A Championship.

Professional career
Potter earned his spot in 2003 Pan American games by finishing 4th at the USA Outdoor Track and Field Championships  Potter had set his personal best (44.58) in the 400 metres  a week earlier on June 14, 2003 in Sacramento while finishing 3rd at the NCAA Men's Outdoor Track and Field Championships for the University of Minnesota behind teammate (and future 4x400 relay teammate at the Pan Am Games), Adam Steele.  He was a 9 time NCAA All American.

Potter has continued to run beyond college with occasional success.  He himself complains his tendency to go out too hard at the beginning of the race costs him coming home.

In 2004 he finished seventh in the semifinal at the Olympic Trials (45.67), second at the Drake Relays (46.89) and first at Cedar Falls (44.88). He did not compete in 2005. Potter graduated from the University of Minnesota in 2004.

Potter was inducted into the St. Michael-Albertville High School Hall of Fame in August 2012.

References

External links
 
 St. Michael Patch: St. Michael-Albertville Announces 2012 Inductees to the Hall of Fame
 USA Track & Field: MITCH POTTER

1980 births
Living people
American male sprinters
Athletes (track and field) at the 2003 Pan American Games
Sportspeople from Minnesota
University of Minnesota alumni
People from St. Michael, Minnesota
Pan American Games gold medalists for the United States
Pan American Games silver medalists for the United States
Pan American Games medalists in athletics (track and field)
Medalists at the 2003 Pan American Games